Hágöngulón is a lake in the Highlands of Iceland. Immediately to the south is the lava field Hágönguhraun . It is fed by various streams consisting of meltwater from Vatnajökull and is drained by Kaldakvísl , a tributary of the Þjórsá, both of which flow in a southwest direction towards the southwest coast.

References

Lakes of Iceland